The 1961–62 Duke Blue Devils men's basketball team represented Duke University in the 1961–62 NCAA Division I men's basketball season. The head coach was Vic Bubas and the team finished the season with an overall record of 20–5.

References 

Duke Blue Devils men's basketball seasons
Duke
1961 in sports in North Carolina
1962 in sports in North Carolina